The Manwan Dam is a large hydroelectric dam in China. It is built on the Mekong (Lancang) River with a capacity of 1,570 MW.

See also 

 List of power stations in China

References

External links 
 The Manwan Dam, the first dam to be built across the Lancang (Mekong) River - 2003 (photo)
 Yu Xiaogang & Jia Jiguo: An Overview of Participatory Social Impact Assessment for Manwan Hydropower Station in Lancang River (pdf)
 Manwan Dam Social Impact Assessment

Hydroelectric power stations in Yunnan
Dams in China
Dams in the Mekong River Basin
Dams completed in 1995
Buildings and structures in Lincang
Buildings and structures in Pu'er